Jim Richards may refer to:

 Jim Richards (basketball), American college basketball coach
 Jim Richards (American football) (born 1946), American football player
 Jim Richards (broadcaster) (born 1966), Canadian radio broadcaster
 Jim Richards (racing driver) (born 1947), New Zealand and Australian race driver
 Jim Richards (rugby league) (1928–2007), Australian rugby league footballer
 Jim Richards, Alberta political candidate, see Calgary-McCall and Calgary-McKnight

See also
 James Richards (disambiguation)